Paederia is a genus of flowering plants in the madder family, Rubiaceae. They are commonly known as sewer vines because of the strong odours exuded when their leaves or stems are crushed or bruised.

Species
Paederia brasiliensis (Hook.f.) Puff (South America)
Paederia bojeriana
Paederia cruddasiana Prain – Sewervine (Asia)
Paederia farinosa
Paederia foetida L. (syn. Paederia scandens) – Skunkvine (Asia)
Paederia lanata
Paederia lanuginosa
Paederia linearis Hook.f.
Paederia majungensis
Paederia mandrarensis
Paederia pilifera
Paederia pospischilii
Paederia sambiranensis
Paederia taolagnarensis
Paederia thouarsiana

References

External links

Rubiaceae genera
Paederieae